Estela Domínguez (born 14 November 1969) is a Spanish former volleyball player who competed in the 1992 Summer Olympics.

References

1969 births
Living people
Spanish women's volleyball players
Olympic volleyball players of Spain
Volleyball players at the 1992 Summer Olympics
Sportspeople from Madrid